Basand بساند is a village of Rawalpindi, Punjab, Pakistan.

References

Populated places in Rawalpindi District